The 1960 GP Ouest-France was the 24th edition of the GP Ouest-France cycle race and was held on 30 August 1960. The race started and finished in Plouay. The race was won by Hubert Ferrer.

General classification

References

1960
1960 in road cycling
1960 in French sport